Saint-François-Xavier-de-Brompton is a municipality in Le Val-Saint-François Regional County Municipality in the Estrie region of Quebec, Canada.  Prior to November 16, 2013 it was a parish municipality.

Demographics

Population

Language
Mother tongue (2011)

See also
List of municipalities in Quebec
Petit Lac Saint-François

References 

Commission de toponymie du Québec

External links

Municipalities in Quebec
Incorporated places in Estrie